van der Putten or Vander Putten is a surname. Notable people with the surname include:

Debbie van der Putten (born 1985), Dutch model
Philippe Vander Putten (born 1959), Belgian businessman
Kai Van Der Putten (born 1978), Film Writer/Director

See also
Van de Putte - surname
Van Putten - surname
Putten (disambiguation)

Surnames of Dutch origin